Stormbringer is the ninth studio album by English rock band Deep Purple, released in November 1974. It was the band's second studio album to feature the Mk III lineup including vocalist David Coverdale and bassist/vocalist Glenn Hughes.

Album cover and title
The cover image of Stormbringer is based on a photo. On 8 July 1927 a tornado near the town of Jasper, Minnesota was photographed by Lucille Handberg. Her photograph has become a classic image, and was used and edited for the album's cover. The same photograph was used for Miles Davis' album Bitches Brew in 1970 and Siouxsie and the Banshees' album Tinderbox in 1986.

Stormbringer is the name of the second Elric of Melniboné novel by Michael Moorcock. It is the name of a magical sword described in many novels and comics by Moorcock and others which enjoyed enormous success in the 1960s and '70s. David Coverdale has denied knowledge of this until shortly after recording the album. In an interview with Charles Shaar Murray in the New Musical Express he claimed that the name was from mythology. A few years later, Moorcock collaborated with Blue Öyster Cult to write "Black Blade," a song that actually was about the sword Stormbringer.

According to Glenn Hughes, the slurred gibberish that is spoken by Coverdale at the beginning of the title track just prior to the first verse is the same backwards dialogue that Linda Blair's character utters in the film The Exorcist, when she is questioned by the priest.

Release and reception

In a posthumous review Alex Henderson of AllMusic writes that "Stormbringer falls short of the excellence of Machine Head and Who Do We Think We Are, but nonetheless boasts some definite classics – including the fiery "Lady Double Dealer," the ominous title song (a goth metal treasure), the sweaty "High Ball Shooter," and the melancholy ballad "Soldier of Fortune."

Guitarist Ritchie Blackmore left Deep Purple following Stormbringer and its subsequent tour, publicly citing his dislike for the funky direction the band was taking. Glenn Hughes nevertheless praises the album and Blackmore's contributions: "People who listen to Stormbringer, please listen...Ritchie Blackmore is damn funky, whether he likes it or not.  He played wonderfully on the album."

Reissues
In 1990, the album was remastered and re-released in the US by Metal Blade Records, with distribution by Warner Bros.

The Friday Music label released a version in the United States on 31 July 2007 (along with Made in Europe and Come Taste the Band). It is unclear which tapes were used as a source for this release, but the label's website claims that the album was digitally remastered (but not expanded).

Additionally EMI (Deep Purple's label for much of the world outside the US) worked with Glenn Hughes on a remastered, expanded version of the album (much like the Burn rerelease) which included bonus remixes and alternative takes.

35th Anniversary Edition
On 23 February 2009 the 35th Anniversary Edition of Stormbringer was released for the European/international market only. The release was expanded into a limited edition two-disc set: the first disc contained the full remastered album along with the new remixes, and the second disc was a DVD containing the quadraphonic mix in 5.1 audio as originally released in the USA on Quad reel back in 1974. After a limited run of the CD/DVD edition, the album became available in a single CD edition. A limited double gatefold vinyl edition was also released.

In popular culture
The song "Stormbringer" is used in the series finale of the US television series Ash vs. Evil Dead.

Track listing

Personnel

Deep Purple
 Ritchie Blackmore – lead guitars
 David Coverdale – lead vocals (all but "Holy Man"), backing vocals
 Glenn Hughes – bass guitar, lead vocals ("Holy Man"), backing vocals (all but "Soldier of Fortune")
 Jon Lord – organ, keyboards, electric piano, backing vocals
 Ian Paice – drums, percussion

Production
 Produced by Deep Purple and Martin Birch
 Recorded at Musicland Studios, Munich in August 1974 
 Engineered by Martin Birch, assisted by Reinhold Mack and Hans Menzel
 Additional recording and mixing by Martin Birch and Ian Paice, assisted by Gary Webb and Garry Ladinsky at The Record Plant, Los Angeles during September 1974
 Mastered at Kendun Recorders, Burbank, California
 35th Anniversary Edition digital mastering and remastering by Peter Mew at Abbey Road Studios, London
 Remixes for the "35th Anniversary Edition" mixed by Glenn Hughes with Peter Mew at Abbey Road Studios, London, 3 November 2006
 "High Ball Shooter" (instrumental) mixed by Gary Massey at Abbey Road Studios, London, April 2002
 Original Quad mix by Gary Ladinsky at The Record Plant, October 1974
 Reformatted for 5.1 surround sound by Peter Mew at Abbey Road Studios, London, February 2008

Charts

Weekly charts

Year-end charts

Certifications

Accolades

References

External links 
 9th studio album
 The Deep Purple Podcast - Episode #18 – Stormbringer

Deep Purple albums
1974 albums
Albums produced by Martin Birch
Warner Records albums
Purple Records albums
Hard rock albums by English artists
Blues rock albums by English artists
Funk rock albums by English artists